The Representative Band of the Policja is a musical unit of the Policja of the Republic of Poland. It is responsible for providing musical support and rendering honors to the President of Poland and the Minister of the Interior and Administration in the capital of Warsaw. It has been under the baton of Chief Conductor Janusz Trzepizur (since 2005) and Drum Major, Staff Sergeant Jakub Pietrucha. Being that it is a central band, it is the seniormost of three Polish police bands, with the other two being based in Wrocław and Katowice.

History
The representative band was founded in 1968 as part of the Milicja Obywatelska of the Polish People's Republic. Its core consisted of a small group of interior ministry musicians, which gradually expanded. In 1984, 1986 and 1988, the band won the Cup of the Minister of Internal Affairs, which was as the time, and still is, the most prestigious trophy the band owns. Until May 2014, the band, whose main tasks includes performing at ceremonial settings, fell under the command of the Warsaw Metropolitan Police Headquarters and operated under the name Warsaw Police Band. On June 1, 2014, the band became a unit of the Presidential Division of the Police Headquarters of the Policja, and was renamed to the Representative Band of the Policja. On the band's 40th anniversary on 22 January 2009, a large concert was held at the Bajka theatre in Warsaw, with a program that featured inter alia, a solo performance of the Włodzimierz Korcz theme from the series 07 zgłoś się.

Events

Musicians from the band perform at various national and agency events, sometimes in a joint service setting with other uniformed bands such as the Representative Band of the Polish Border Guard and the Representative Central Band of the Polish Armed Forces. Being the official band of the Policja as well as the municipal City Guard, the group's musicians are often invited to play marching music for ceremonies on national holidays such as the following:

Flag Day
3rd May Constitution Day
Victory in Europe Day
Police Day (Święto Policji)
National Warsaw Uprising Remembrance Day
Municipal Police Day
National Independence Day

It also supports the Polish Police college in the town of Szczytno. The band has had the opportunity to present its artistic skills during prestigious festivals and military tattoos in Belarus, Belgium, the Czech Republic, Denmark, Germany, Russia and many other neighboring countries. Its musicians annually take part in the International Congress of Music in Kraków and donate all the proceeds of their performances to a number of charities for the sick and disadvantaged. In 2017, the band took part in the Birmingham International Tattoo in England.

See also
 Law enforcement in Poland
 Band of the Castle Guards and the Police of the Czech Republic
 Central Band of the Armed Forces of the Republic of Belarus
 Police Band Service of the Ministry of Internal Affairs of Russia
 Band of the Department of Carabinier Troops
 Police band (music)

References

External links

 video of the Band of the Policja performing during an International Festival of Brass Bands (YouTube)
 The band in Gdynia in 2013
 Polska Policja - Orkiestra Reprezentacyjna Policji nagrywa kolejną płytę

Polish musical groups
Polish ceremonial units
Police bands
1968 establishments in Poland